The AARP Movies for Grownups Award for Best Actress is one of the AARP Movies for Grownups Awards presented annually by the AARP since the awards' inception in 2002. The award honors the best actress over the age of fifty. The Best Actress Award is one of the seven original trophies issued by AARP the Magazine, along with awards for Best Movie for Grownups, Best Director, Best Actor, Best Foreign Film, Best Documentary, and Best Movie for Grownups Who Refuse to Grow Up.

Winners and Nominees

2000s

2010s

2020s

Multiple wins and nominations

The following individuals received two or more Best Actress awards:

The following individuals received multiple Best Actress nominations:

Age superlatives

See also
 Academy Award for Best Actress
 BAFTA Award for Best Actress in a Leading Role
 César Award for Best Actress
 Critics' Choice Movie Award for Best Actress
 Golden Globe Award for Best Actress in a Motion Picture – Drama
 Golden Globe Award for Best Actress – Motion Picture Comedy or Musical
 Independent Spirit Award for Best Female Lead
 Screen Actors Guild Award for Outstanding Performance by a Female Actor in a Leading Role

References

Actress
Film awards for lead actress
Awards established in 2002